Cicindela abdominalis is a species of tiger beetle in the genus Cicindela.

References

abdominalis
Beetles described in 1801